The 2010 Friends Provident t20 tournament was the inaugural Friends Provident t20 Twenty20 cricket competition for the England and Wales first-class counties. The competition ran from 1 June 2010 until the finals day at The Rose Bowl on 14 August 2010. The eighteen counties were split into two regions, North and South, with the top four teams from each group progressing to the quarter-final knockout stage. The competition was won by Hampshire Royals, who beat Essex Eagles in the semi-finals, and Somerset in the final, by virtue of losing fewer wickets in a tied match.

Pre-season
In May, before the Twenty20 season began, the England cricket team were crowned world Twenty20 champions at the 2010 ICC World Twenty20 competition in the West Indies. England player Kevin Pietersen was named player of the tournament. National interest in the Twenty20 format of the sport was very high as the old Twenty20 Cup competition was replaced by the new Friends Provident t20 cricket league competition.

Teams

Team summaries

Group stage

North Group

South Group

Knockout stage

Quarter-finals

Semi-finals

Final

Players statistics

Most runs

Most sixes

Most wickets

References

See also
 Twenty20 Cup
 2009 Twenty20 Cup

Friends Life t20 seasons
Friends Provident t20
Friends Provident t20